State elections were held in South Australia on 17 September 1977. All 47 seats in the South Australian House of Assembly were up for election. The incumbent Australian Labor Party led by Premier of South Australia Don Dunstan won a fourth term in government, defeating the Liberal Party of Australia led by Leader of the Opposition David Tonkin.

Background
Parliamentary elections for the lower house of the Parliament of South Australia were held in South Australia in 1977. There was no election for Legislative Council; and as of 2020, this is the most recent South Australian election which has not been for both houses.

The Labor Party led by Don Dunstan, which had won the previous three elections in 1970, 1973 and 1975, defeated the Liberal Party of Australia opposition led by David Tonkin. It was the first time that a Labor government in South Australia had been re-elected for a fourth term, and would be the first nine-year-incumbent Labor government. This would be Dunstan's last election before resigning due to ill health in 1979.

This was the first election after the end of Playmander seat weighting where one vote one value was introduced. At the previous election some metropolitan seats still saw more than three times the number of voters than in some rural seats, despite most of the Playmander being abolished nearly a decade ago. The redistribution was the reason Dunstan called an early election.

The Australian Democrats ran for the first time under a joint New LM-Australian Democrats ticket, winning an average 12.3 percent of the primary vote in the 12 electorates they contested, with former LCL MP Robin Millhouse retaining his seat of Mitcham, which he would hold until 1982.

Key dates
 Issue of writ: 25 August 1977
 Close of nominations: 2 September 1977
 Polling day: 19 September 1977
 Return of writ: On or before 3 October 1977

Results
Keith Russack stood as an Independent Liberal, but later joined the Liberal Party; giving the numbers: 27 Labor, 18 Liberal, 1 Country Party, 1 Australian Democrat.

A 1979 Norwood by-election was triggered as a result of Dunstan's resignation. Labor retained the seat on a considerably reduced majority.

|}

Seats changing party representation

This table lists changes in party representation at the 1977 election.

 Members listed in italics did not recontest this election.
 Keith Russack was the sitting Liberal member for the abolished district of Gouger. He was not pre-selected for any seat in the redistribution, so he quit the party and ran as an Independent candidate for the seat of Goyder.
 David Boundy was elected as a Liberal Movement member for Goyder, but joined the Liberal party in 1976. He was defeated by Keith Russack, who re-joined the Liberal party after being elected.
 Sitting Liberal MP for the abolished district of Heysen, David Wotton was preselected for the district of Murray over incumbent MP Ivon Wardle. Wardle contested the election as an Independent, but was defeated by Wotton.
 Robin Millhouse was elected in 1975 as Liberal Movement member for Mitcham. He joined the Democrats in 1977 and won a second term to his seat.
 Ted Connelly was elected as an Independent MP for the abolished district of Pirie in 1975, but later joined the Labor party. He contested the seat of Rocky River and lost.
 Sitting Labor MP for the abolished seat of Tea Tree Gully, Molly Byrne instead contested the new seat of Todd and won.

Post-election pendulum

See also
 Results of the South Australian state election, 1977 (House of Assembly)
 Candidates of the 1977 South Australian state election
 Members of the South Australian House of Assembly, 1977-1979
 Members of the South Australian Legislative Council, 1975-1979

References

 Historical lower house results
 Historical upper house results
 State and federal election results  in Australia since 1890

Specific

Elections in South Australia
1977 elections in Australia
1970s in South Australia
September 1977 events in Australia